Marcania is a monotypic genus of flowering plants belonging to the family Acanthaceae. It only contains one known species, Marcania grandiflora J.B.Imlay 

It is native to Thailand within Indo-China.

The genus name of Marcania is in honour of Alexander Marcan (1883–1953), an English collector of plants in south-east Asia and Thailand. The Latin specific epithet of grandiflora refers 2 two words, 'grandi' meaning large and 'flora' meaning flower.
Both the genus and species were first described and published in Bull. Misc. Inform. Kew 1939 on page 136 in 1939.

References

Acanthaceae
Acanthaceae genera
Plants described in 1845
Flora of Thailand